Olhão is a civil parish in the municipality of Olhão, in the Portuguese Algarve. The population in 2011 was 14,914, in an area of 12.25 km². Olhão is the largest parish by population density in the municipality.

Architecture

 Church of Nossa Senhora do Rosário, constructed in the first-half of the 17th century, it became the centre of the parish when in 1695, Olhão was raised to the status of ecclesiastical parish. It was damaged during the 1755 Lisbon earthquake, but reconstructed during the intervening years to include five altars that included retables for Senhor dos Passos; Santa Clara; Santa Luzia and São Sebastião;
 Church of Nossa Senhora da Soledade, built in the Baroque and Roccoco styles, the church was once the parochial church, but is primarily used as a pilgrimage chapel.

References

Freguesias of Olhão
Towns of the Algarve